Hocine Zehouane, born in 1935 in Draâ Ben Khedda, is an Algerian politician and human rights activist.

Early life 
Hocine Zehouane was born in Draâ Ben Kheda in Kabylia in Algeria. He joined the Movement for the Triumph of Democratic Liberties MTLD,  in 1954,  while still in high school. He was then arrested and  Imprisoned from 1955 to 1957. On his release from prison, he joined the maquis in Kabylia. Wilaya III officer (Kabylia). He joined the Provisional Government of the Algerian Republic in March 1960.

The League for Human Rights 
In 1985 he participated in the founding of the first Algerian League for Human Rights (LADH), and in 2005 he became president of the Algerian League for the Defense of Human Rights.

After the liberation 
As a member of the Political Bureau of the National Liberation Front in 1964, in charge of the guidance sector, Hocine Zehouane participated in the first regional Congress of the General Union of Algerian Workers. On this occasion, he declared that "Algerian workers must gain access to political power".

He opposed the coup d'etat of June 19, 1965 by Houari Boumedienne, which led him to prison before being placed under house arrest in the south from 1965 to 1971. He went into exile in France after 1973 and returned to his country after the death of Algerian President Houari Boumédiène.

References

Algerian nationalists
20th-century Algerian politicians
African democratic socialists
Algerian Arab nationalists
National Liberation Front (Algeria)
Movement for the Triumph of Democratic Liberties politicians
Kabyle people
Muslim socialists